"Girl Talk" is a song by American group TLC. It was written by band members Lisa "Left Eye" Lopes and Tionne "T-Boz" Watkins along with Anita McLoud, Edmund "Eddie Hustle" Clement, and Kandi Burruss for the group's fourth studio album, 3D (2002). Recorded a few days before Lopes' passing in April 2002, production on the song was helmed by Clement. Lyrically, "Girl Talk" has the protagonist warning men that if they lack in the bedroom, it will spread on the street amongst the women.

The song was released as the album's lead single on September 6, 2002. While the song contains vocals by Lopes, the music video for "Girl Talk," directed by Dave Meyers, marked the band's first release without Lopes, following her death in April of the same year. Upon its release, "Girl Talk" reached number twenty-three on the US Billboards Hot R&B/Hip-Hop Songs chart and number twenty-eight on the Billboard Hot 100, becoming the group's 12th top forty entry on the latter chart. In addition, the song reached the top twenty in Denmark and New Zealand, the top thirty in the UK and the top fifty in Australia.

Background
"Girl Talk" was written by TLC members Lisa Lopes and Tionne Watkins along with Anita McLoud, Edmund "Eddie Hustle" Clement, and Kandi Burruss, while production was helmed by Clement. On the song, the trio address being disappointed by their "jive-talking lovers," singing: "Put in work / 'cause if you don't, that girl just gonna go spreading the word [...] Girls talk about the booty too." Watkins and Rozonda Thomas called the "controversial." In an interview with MTV News they further elaborated: "Iit's talking about [...] all the stereotypes of men, with the big hands and big feet. Just because you have big hands and big feet does not mean you have big thaaangs [...] And just because you have a big thing does not mean you know how to work it. Some people always say they have big things and they don't. And just like how men talk about women — 'I had her, I had her' — we talk about you, too." In 2019, rapper Dashun "Eastwood" Woodard, who had ghost written and was featured in Lopes' verse on "Girl Talk," told Variety that her vocals were recorded three days before her passing.

Critical reception
Chuck Taylor from Billboard called the song "one solid, signature track" and "a return to celebrate." He found that "Girl Talk" was a "lot more than a tribute to the memory of Lopes," with TLC showing "its younger contemporaries how to make some real music, marrying a bumpy, funky street jam with a wonderfully singable melody, chantlike hook [...] a vocal oozing with attitude, and a center-section rap from Left Eye." In his review for parent album 3D, BBC Music editor Christian Hopwood remarked that "Quickie" and "Girl Talk" are "upfront party jams propelled by bare faced cheek and female power." People magazine called "Girl Talk" a "funky, fresh-mouthed first single."

Music video

A music video for "Girl Talk" was directed by Dave Meyers and filmed in Atlanta, Georgia on October 21–23, 2002, six months after Lisa Lopes' death. The video depicts the two remaining members, Watkins and Thomas, in several locations that are supposed to take place in the Southern United States, in an African rain forest and in a metropolitan area in Japan, dancing and talking with other girls, representing how girls all over the world "are chatting amongst themselves about guys who are no good in the bedroom." An animated segment is used during Lopes's rap verse, where all three girls appear as cartoon versions of themselves. The video ends with a tribute to Left Eye, reading: "In Loving Memory of Lisa 'Left Eye' Lopes."

Regardings Lopes' absence, Watkins remarked that "it was hard to come up with ideas [for the video]" after her death.  In an interview with MTV News, she said: "She isn't here. That's reality. It's not easy to come up with how to incorporate her, especially when she has a whole rap in the song." Thomas further commented: "What we didn't want to do is [make] your typical video [where] you see old clips. Sometimes, stuff like that fits certain songs, but to show old clips of Lisa didn't fit "Girl Talk." What you'll get from the video is no matter where you go [and whatever language you speak], women will talk about men."

Track listing

Notes
 denotes additional producer

Credits and personnel
Credits lifted from the liner notes of 3D.

Leslie Braithwaite – recording engineer
Kandi Burruss – writer
Josh Butler – recording engineer
Edmund "Eddie Hustle" Clement – producer, writer
Kevin Davis – mixing engineer
Steve Fisher – engineering assistant

Debra Killings – background vocals
Lisa "Left Eye" Lopes – vocals, writer
Anita McLoud – writer
Dion Peters – engineering assistant
Rozonda "Chilli" Thomas – vocals
Tionne "T-Boz" Watkins – vocals, writer

Charts

References

2002 singles
2002 songs
2003 singles
Arista Records singles
Music videos directed by Dave Meyers (director)
Songs written by Lisa Lopes
Songs written by Kandi Burruss
Songs written by Tionne Watkins
TLC (group) songs

it:Girl Talk